XEVB-AM is a radio station on 1310 AM in Monterrey, Nuevo León. It is owned by Grupo Radio Alegría and is known as ABC Noticias, carrying a news/talk format.

History
XEVB received its concession on August 31, 1977.

References

Radio stations in Monterrey